Kamil Altan (7 April 1924 – 25 February 2011) was a Turkish footballer. He competed in the men's tournament at the 1952 Summer Olympics.

Career
Prior to the 1952–53 season, Altan moved from Eyüpspor to Galatasaray, where he played until the end of the 1959–60 season. He scored one goal in 59 league appearances for the club. In the 1954–55 and 1955–56 seasons, he was part of the teams winning the Istanbul Football League. He then signed with Taksim, playing there until 1960.

After ending his football career, he became coach of Galatasaray's youth team in 1961. After staying in this position for a while, he was the manager of Tophane Tayfunspor, an amateur team, in the 1970s.

Personal life
Altan died on 25 February 2011. He was buried in Selimpaşa Cemetery after noon prayers at the Teşvikiye Mosque on 27 February.

Honours
Galatasaray
Istanbul Football League: 1954–55, 1955–56

References

External links
 
 

1924 births
2011 deaths
Turkish footballers
Olympic footballers of Turkey
Footballers at the 1952 Summer Olympics
Footballers from Istanbul
Association football defenders
Eyüpspor footballers
Galatasaray S.K. footballers
Taksim SK footballers
Turkey international footballers